John J. Dailey  (October 26, 1853 – ?) was an American professional baseball player and umpire. He was the regular shortstop for the 1875 Washington Nationals and he played two July games for the Brooklyn Atlantics after the Nationals went out of business. After his playing career, Dailey umpired 12 games in the National League in 1882, and 25 games in the American Association – 23 in 1884 and 2 in 1889.

External links
, or Retrosheet

19th-century baseball players
Washington Nationals (NA) players
Brooklyn Atlantics players
Major League Baseball shortstops
Major League Baseball umpires
Baseball players from New York (state)
1853 births
Year of death unknown
Manchester (minor league baseball) players
Utica Pent Ups players
Capital City of Albany players
Rochester Hop Bitters players